Kira's Reason: A Love Story is a 2001 Danish drama directed by Ole Christian Madsen and written by Madsen and Mogens Rukov. The film stars Stine Stengade in a character study of a young mother who, released after two years in a psychiatric ward, struggles to hold her marriage, family and life intact. Filmed using the minimalist techniques of the Dogme 95 movement, Kira's Reason is also known as Dogme No. 21. Kira's Reason won both the Bodil and Robert Awards as the Best Danish Film of 2001. For her leading performance, Stengade received the Bodil and Robert awards for Best Actress.

Cast

References

External links 
 En Kærlighedshistorie at IMDb
 
 
 

2001 drama films
2001 films
Best Danish Film Bodil Award winners
Best Danish Film Robert Award winners
Danish drama films
2000s Danish-language films
Dogme 95 films
Films directed by Ole Christian Madsen
Nimbus Film films